"It Takes Two" is a song by New York hip hop duo Rob Base and DJ E-Z Rock that became a top-40 single and was later certified platinum by the Recording Industry Association of America (RIAA). Since its release in 1988, the song has been covered and sampled by several recording artists. 

"There are many critics and listeners who claim that Rob Base & DJ EZ Rock's 'It Takes Two' is the greatest hip-hop single ever cut," noted music critic Stephen Thomas Erlewine of All Music Guide. "It's hard to disagree with them." Spin magazine published a list titled "100 Greatest Singles of All Time" in 1989 and ranked "It Takes Two" at No. 1. In 2021, it was listed at No. 116 on Rolling Stone's "Top 500 Best Songs of All Time".

Composition and background
The song was produced by Rob Base, DJ E-Z Rock, and William Hamilton and built around the "Woo! Yeah!" sample from Lyn Collins' 1972 song "Think (About It)."  The song was sampled in November 1989 by the group Seduction in their hit song "Two to Make It Right" as well as by The Black Eyed Peas in their 2009 hit "Rock That Body".

Charts

Certifications

"It Takes Scoop"

In 2000, American disc jockey DJ Kool used "It Takes Two" as a basis for his song of the same name, featuring Fatman Scoop. His version charted at number 12 on the US Billboard Hot Rap Songs chart that July. Fatman Scoop later recorded his own version of DJ Kool's take, retitling it "It Takes Scoop", which features the Crooklyn Clan. It was released as the follow-up to "Be Faithful", which topped the UK Singles Chart in October 2003 and charted worldwide. Fatman Scoop wrote the track with Giotto Bini and Andrea Rizzo, and it was produced by the Crooklyn Clan.

Along with the original "Think (About It)" sample, "It Takes Scoop" contains elements from "Treat 'Em Right" and "Caught Up" by Chubb Rock and "White Lines (Don't Don't Do It)" by Grandmaster Flash and Melle Mel. Released as a single on February 9, 2004, the song reached number nine on the UK Singles Chart and became a top-40 hit in Australia, Ireland, Italy, and Switzerland.

Track listings

US CD single
 "It Takes Two" (radio edit)
 "It Takes Two" (extended mix)
 "It Takes Two" (original live mix)
 "Area Code"
 "Bonus Beats"

US 12-inch single
A. "It Takes Two" (Crooklyn Clan mix)
B. "It Takes Two" (Crooklyn Clan edit)

UK and Australian CD single'
 "It Takes Scoop" (album version) – 4:19
 "It Takes Scoop" (radio edit) – 2:50
 "It Takes Scoop" (video CD-ROM)

UK 12-inch single and European CD single
A. "It Takes Scoop" (radio edit) – 2:50
B. "It Takes Scoop" (album version) – 4:19

Charts

Weekly charts
"It Takes Two"

"It Takes Scoop"

Year-end charts

Release history

In popular culture
 The song was used in the films Iron Man 2, Bumblebee, The Proposal, Sisters, The Disaster Artist, Love & Basketball, and Spies in Disguise.

See also
 1988 in music

References

External links
Music video on YouTube

1988 debut singles
1988 songs
2004 singles
2017 singles
604 Records singles
Carly Rae Jepsen songs
Def Jam Recordings singles
Fatman Scoop songs
Interscope Records singles
Lil Yachty songs
Profile Records singles
Rob Base & DJ E-Z Rock songs
Schoolboy Records singles
Song recordings produced by Mike Will Made It